The Capture of Plymouth was a battle of the American Civil War, fought in October 1864. Following the sinking of CSS Albemarle during a commando raid led by Lieutenant William B. Cushing, Union naval forces attacked Plymouth, North Carolina, which was defended by Confederate artillery. After three days of fighting, the Confederates retreated from the area, allowing the Union navy to land men and occupy the town.

Order of battle
United States Navy:
USS Wyalusing, gunboat, 1,173 tons, 14 guns
USS Shamrock, gunboat, 974 tons, 11 guns, flagship
USS Otsego, gunboat, 974 tons, 10 guns
USS Tacony, gunboat, 974 tons, 9 guns
USS Chicopee, gunboat, 974 tons, 10 guns
USS Commodore Hull, gunboat, 376 tons, 6 guns
USS Valley City, gunboat, 190 tons, 4 guns
USS Whitehead, gunboat, 136 tons, 1 gun
USS Bazely, gunboat, 50 tons
USS Belle, torpedo boat, 52 tons, 2 guns, 1 spar torpedo

See also
Naval battles of the American Civil War

References

External links

Plymouth, Capture of
Plymouth, Capture of
Plymouth, Capture of
Plymouth
Washington County, North Carolina
Conflicts in 1864
1864 in North Carolina
Plymouth
October 1864 events